Miracles Ain't What They Used To Be Plus... is a 2016 collection of memoirs and essays by American author Joe R. Lansdale. It includes Lansdale's essays on how he came to be an author, and on his inspirations, personal beliefs, ideas for the vast amount of published work he has done over his 40 years of writing novels, short stories, novellas, and comic books.

Table of contents
The Parable of the Stick -A Hap and Leonard short story
Apollo Red
Short Night -A Hap and Leonard short story
Miracles Ain't What They Used to Be
That's How you Clean a Squirrel
Outspoken Interview with Joe R. Lansdale
Dark Inspiration 
The Drowned Man
Darkness in the East
Doggone Justice
The Day Before the Day After
Bibliography

Publication
This book is part of the PM Press Outspoken Author series.

References

External links
 Joe R. Lansdale official website
 PM Press official website

2016 non-fiction books
Works by Joe R. Lansdale
PM Press books